Rangia College is an institution of general higher education stablished on the north bank of mighty Brahmaputra. It is located in Rangiya town of kamrup rural district of Assam.

History
It was established on 5 August 1963. The college has rendered pioneering services to the community by catering to the needs of the vast and extensive area inhabited predominantly by socially and economically backward segments of the population. Rangia College has been serving the socio-educational needs of the entire North Kamrup area which is primarily a rural base.

Departments

Arts stream
 Arabic
  Assamese
  Bengali
  Bodo
 Economics
 Education
  English
 History
 Philosophy
 Political Science
 Sanskrit

Science stream
 Botany
 Biology
 Geography
 Chemistry
 Mathematics
 Physics
 Zoology

See also 
Gauhati University
Pub Kamrup College
Rangia Higher Secondary School

References

Colleges in India
Universities and colleges in Assam
Colleges affiliated to Gauhati University
Kamrup district
Educational institutions established in 1963
1963 establishments in Assam